Sphaeralcea emoryi is a species of flowering plant in the mallow family known by the common name Emory's globemallow. It is native to the Southwestern United States, California and Northwestern Mexico. It grows in desert habitat and sometimes disturbed areas such as roadsides.

Description
Sphaeralcea emoryi can be similar to its relative, copper globemallow (Sphaeralcea angustifolia).

It has woolly erect stems that can exceed two meters in height. The gray-green leaf blades are oval to triangular, usually lobed on the edges, and up to 5.5 centimeters long.

The showy inflorescence bears clusters of flowers each with five petals around a centimeter long. The petals are usually orange, or sometimes lavender.

References

External links
Calflora: Sphaeralcea emoryi (Emory's globemallow)
 Jepson eFlora (TJM2) treatment of Sphaeralcea emoryi
Sphaeralcea emoryi — UC Photos gallery

emoryi
Flora of California
Flora of Arizona
Flora of Baja California
Flora of Nevada
Flora of New Mexico
Flora of Sonora
Flora of the California desert regions
Flora of the Sonoran Deserts
Natural history of the Colorado Desert
Natural history of the Mojave Desert
Flora without expected TNC conservation status